David Lowing (born 4 September 1983) is a Scottish footballer currently with Irvine Meadow F.C in the Super League Premier Division of the Scottish Junior Football Association, West Region.

References

External links

Living people
1983 births
Scottish footballers
Ayr United F.C. players
Forfar Athletic F.C. players
Stirling Albion F.C. players
St Mirren F.C. players
People educated at Linwood High School
Association football defenders